Mangelia neapolitana is a species of sea snail, a marine gastropod mollusc in the family Mangeliidae, the cone snails and their allies.

It is considered a synonym of Mangelia costulata Risso, 1826, but recognized as an accepted species by Tucker.

Description

Distribution
This species occurs in the Mediterranean Sea off Sicily.

References

 Delle Chiaje S., 1841–1844. Descrizione e notomia degli animali invertebrati della Sicilia citeriore osservati vivi negli anni 1822–1830. 8 v. Stabilimento Tipografico di C. Batelli & Co., Napoli. [vol. 1, pp. 1–98, 1841 – vol. 2, pp. 146, 1841 – vol. 3, pp. 1–142, 1841 -vol. 4, pp. 1–142, 1841 – vol. 5, pp. 1–165, 1841 -vol. 6, tavv. 1–86, 1841 – vol. 7, tavv. 87–173, 1841, tavv. 174–181, 1844 – vol. 8, pp. 1–48, 1844].

External links
 

neapolitana
Gastropods described in 1841